Peter Falkner was a German fencing master, active in the late 15th century (roughly 1470s or 1480s), influenced by Paulus Kal.
He is the author of a fechtbuch, now  KK 5012, at the Kunsthistorisches Museum, Vienna. He wrote treatises on the usage of longswords, messers, daggers, and on various other weapons of the time period

References

German historical fencers
German male fencers
15th-century German people
Year of birth unknown
Year of death unknown